1776 is a year and may also refer to:

 1776 (musical), a 1969 musical based on the events leading to the writing and signing of the United States Declaration of Independence
 1776 (film), a 1972 film adaptation of the above musical
 1776 (book), a 2005 book by David McCullough about the events surrounding the start of the American Revolution
 1776 (game), a 1974 Avalon Hill board wargame based on the American Revolution
 1776, a 2013 album by King Conquer
 1776, a technology business accelerator and venture fund from Washington, DC.
 1776 Project

See also
 17776, a 2017 speculative fiction narrative by Jon Bois